Charlie Rymer (born December 18, 1967) is an American professional golfer who played on the PGA Tour and the Nike Tour. He is currently an analyst for the Golf Channel.

Amateur career
Rymer was born in Cleveland, Tennessee and grew up in Fort Mill, South Carolina. Rymer played college golf at Georgia Tech, where he was a third-team All-American in 1988 and an honorable mention All-American in 1989. He won five tournaments during his time at Georgia Tech. He was inducted into the Georgia Tech Athletics Hall of Fame in 2000. He also won the U.S. Junior Amateur in 1985.

Professional career
Rymer joined the Nike Tour in 1994. He won the 1994 Nike South Carolina Classic and then recorded a runner-up finish the following week at the Nike Central Georgia Open. He earned his PGA Tour card for 1995 through qualifying school. He recorded his career best finish on the PGA Tour in 1995 at the Shell Houston Open, third place,  and his career best money list finish at 103rd. In 1996, he finished 145th on the money list, good enough for partial status on Tour the following year. He split time between the PGA Tour and the Nike Tour in 1997. He played on the Nike Tour in 1998, his last year on Tour.

Broadcasting career
Rymer started working as a commentator for ESPN in 1998. He began working for the Golf Channel in 2009.

In December 2018, Rymer entered into a multimedia partnership with Golf Tourism Solutions, a destination marketing agency managing PlayGolfMyrtleBeach.com, to become the voice of the Myrtle Beach golf scene.

Amateur wins
1985 U.S. Junior Amateur

Professional wins (1)

Nike Tour wins (1)

Results in major championships

CUT = missed the half-way cut
Note: Rymer never played in the Masters Tournament or the PGA Championship.

See also
1994 PGA Tour Qualifying School graduates

References

External links

American male golfers
Georgia Tech Yellow Jackets men's golfers
PGA Tour golfers
Golfers from Tennessee
American television personalities
Golf writers and broadcasters
People from Cleveland, Tennessee
1967 births
Living people